Charles Landis is the name of:

Charles B. Landis, politician
Charles K. Landis, land developer and acquitted murderer